Chandi Bhanjyang  is a village development committee in Syangja District in the Gandaki Zone of central Nepal. At the time of the 2011 Nepal census it had a population of 3942 people living in 891 individual households. It is well known for its bullfighting events which are held twice every summer

References

External links
UN map of the municipalities of Syangja District

Populated places in Syangja District